Frantic is the eleventh studio album by English singer Bryan Ferry, released on 15 April 2002 by Virgin Records. The majority of tracks were produced by the team of Rhett Davies, Colin Good, and Ferry; David A. Stewart and Robin Trower also co-produced several tracks.

{{Album ratings
| rev1 = AllMusic
| rev1score =  [ link]
| rev2 = Entertainment Weekly
| rev2score = B+ link
| rev3 = PopMatters
| rev3score = Favourable link
| rev4 = Stylus Magazine| rev4score = A− link
}}

Critical reception
Tim DiGravina of AllMusic wrote of the album, "Some listeners might suggest that an album this varied has an identity crisis, but with [these] standout tracks as glorious as the Dylan covers and the Eno closer, Frantic is a fascinating addition to Bryan Ferry's accomplished discography." David Medsker of PopMatters stated that "Frantic may play like a greatest hits album, with bits here recalling Boys and Girls'' and songs there echoing late Roxy, and it may rank in the middle to upper of the pack of his overall body of work. But it's the most cohesive album he's done in ages. Given how down and out he appeared to be, the fact that Frantic is more than half good is cause for joy."

Track listing

Personnel

Musicians

 Bryan Ferry – vocals (1–6, 8–13), harmonica (1, 3, 5, 8, 13), keyboards (4, 10, 12, 13), arrangements (7)
 Colin Good – acoustic piano (1–6, 8, 11), string arrangements (1–3, 6, 11, 13), Mellotron (6), virginal (7), arrangements (7), keyboards (13)
 Terry Disley – keyboards (4, 10, 12)
 Brian Eno – keyboards (4, 10, 13), backing vocals (4, 12, 13), guitar (13)
 Paul Taylor – keyboards (4, 10, 12), programming (10)
 Ben Chapman – programming (4, 10, 13)
 Reece Gilmore – programming (4, 12, 13)
 James Sanger – programming (4, 13)
 Eddie LeJeune – accordion (9), backing vocals (9)
 Pete Glenister – guitar (1, 2, 6, 8, 13)
 Mick Green – guitar (1–3, 6, 8, 11)
 Chris Spedding – guitar (2, 4, 6, 8, 12, 13), sitar (11)
 David Williams – guitar (2–4, 6, 12, 13), bass (4)
 Adam Lamprell – guitar (4, 10, 13)
 David A. Stewart – guitar (4, 10, 12)
 Martin Wheatley – guitar (8)
 D. L. Menard – guitar (9), backing vocals (9)
 Jonny Greenwood – guitar (10)
 Robin Trower – guitar (10)
 Zev Katz – bass (1–3, 6, 8, 9, 11, 13)
 Marcus Miller – bass (10, 12)
 Bobby Irwin – drums (1–3, 6, 13)
 Andy Newmark – drums (4, 10, 12), percussion (8, 13)
 Paul Thompson – drums (4, 8), percussion (11)
 Frank Ricotti – percussion (1, 2, 6–9, 11)
 Otis Ferry – whip effects (2)
 Rosie Wetters – cello (1–3, 6, 11, 13)
 Natalia Bonner – viola (1–3, 6, 11, 13)
 Lucy Theo – violin (1–3, 6, 11, 13)
 Lucy Wilkins – violin (1–3, 6, 11, 13)
 Julia Thornton – harp (7, 8)
 Keith Thompson – recorder (7), crumhorn (7), curtal (7), woodwind (8), oboe (11)
 Ken Smith – fiddle (9), backing vocals (9)
 Robert Fowler – alto saxophone (11)
 Sarah Brown – backing vocals (2, 4, 6, 8, 11, 12)
 Kelli Dayton – backing vocals (2, 10, 11)
 Alice Retif – backing vocals (2, 10)
 Audrey Wheeler – backing vocals (2, 4, 12)
 Nicole Blumberg – backing vocals (4)
 Stephen Granville – backing vocals (4, 12)
 Mary Nelson – soprano vocals (7, 8, 11)
 Alison Goldfrapp – backing vocals (11)
 Lucy Kaplansky – backing vocals (11)
 Patti Russo – backing vocals (11)
 Jhelisa Anderson – backing vocals (12)

Technical
 Bryan Ferry – producer
 Rhett Davies – producer (1–3, 5–8, 11, 13), additional producer (4, 9, 10, 12)
 Colin Good – producer (1–3, 5–8, 11, 13), additional producer (4, 9, 10, 12)
 David A. Stewart – producer (4, 12)
 Robin Trower – producer (9, 10, 13)
 Nick Addison – engineer 
 Michael Boddy – engineer 
 Neil Brockbank – engineer, mixing (5)
 Ash Howes – engineer, mixing (10)
 Richard T. Norris – engineer 
 Sven Taits – engineer 
 Mark Tucker – engineer 
 Dan Grech-Marguerat – assistant engineer 
 Kevin Harp – assistant engineer 
 Bob Clearmountain – mixing (1–4, 6–9, 11–13)
 Bob Ludwig – mastering at Gateway Mastering (Portland, Maine)

Artwork
 Bogdan Zarkowski – design, photography
 Nicholas De Ville – design
 Bryan Ferry – design
 Eric Boman – photography
 Albert Sanchez – photography

Charts

References

2002 albums
Albums produced by David A. Stewart
Albums produced by Rhett Davies
Albums recorded at RAK Studios
Bryan Ferry albums
Virgin Records albums